Rock 'n' Roll is the seventh studio album by American hard rock band Buckcherry, released on August 21, 2015 by F-Bomb Records and Century Media Records. It is the band's first album with bassist Kelly LeMieux and their last album with guitarist Keith Nelson and drummer Xavier Muriel before they both left Buckcherry in 2017, due to disagreements with vocalist Josh Todd over the band's direction.

Clocking in at 36 minutes, Rock 'n' Roll is Buckcherry’s shortest album.

Track listing

Personnel

Buckcherry
Josh Todd – vocals
Keith Nelson – guitars
Stevie D – guitars
Xavier Muriel – drums
Kelly LeMieux – bass

Additional musicians
Wally Minko – keyboards on "Rain's Falling" and "The Feeling Never Dies", horn arrangement on "Tight Pants"
Dan Fornero – trumpet on "Tight Pants"
Tom Evans – saxophone on "Tight Pants"
Fred Simmons – trombone on "Tight Pants"

Recording personnel
Keith Nelson – production
Jun Murakawa – recording
Joe Barresi – mixing
Dave Collins – mastering

Additional personnel
Cyclical – art direction, packaging
Strati Hovartos – photography
Stevie D – photography

Charts

References

Buckcherry albums
2015 albums